The 1967–68 season was the Bullets 7th season in the league. After losing 61 games, the Bullets were forced to rebuild through the draft. With the first overall pick, the Bullets selected Earl Monroe. Monroe was a flashy player, a deft ball handler, and a creative, unconventional shot maker. He was the first player to make the reverse spin on the dribble a trademark move. In his rookie season he would lead the Bullets in scoring with 24.3 points per game, and win the Rookie of the Year Award. The Bullets improved by 15 games posting a 36–46 record. The Bullets would still finish in last place.

Regular season

Season standings

Record vs. opponents

Game log

Awards and honors
Earl Monroe, NBA Rookie of the Year Award
Earl Monroe, NBA All-Rookie Team 1st Team

References

Bullets on Basketball Reference

Washington Wizards seasons
Baltimore
Baltimore Bullets
Baltimore Bullets